is a Japanese yuri manga written and illustrated by Asumiko Nakamura which has been serialized in Hakusensha's manga magazine Rakuen Le Paradis since 2017. It was licensed for an English-language release by Seven Seas Entertainment in 2020.

Plot 
Ruby is a student at an elite European boarding school. Her year at school begins to unravel when her parents ask her not to come home for Christmas so they can attempt to mend their failing marriage. Ruby finds herself stuck at school with only one other student for company- Steph Nagy. While Steph remains aloof, Ruby slowly becomes more interested in the other girl.

Characters 
Ruby Canossa
 A cheerful year eleven student, she struggles with her own lack of agency surrounding her parents inevitable divorce. Ruby becomes interested in Steph after they spend the Christmas holidays at school.

Stephanie Nagy
 A stand-offish year twelve student, her cool demeanour has gained her the nickname Steel Steph as well as a rumour that she has a metal prosthetic leg. Despite this she is still very popular among her peers.

Media

Manga

Reception 
In Anime News Network gave the first volume an overall B grade, feeling that while the story lacked some forward progression, it largely made up for by "the skillful way in which Nakamura blends different traditions of girls' school stories, mixing the midnight feasts of British and American girls' literature with the strict hierarchy and crushes of Class S manga and novels." Erica Friedman of Yuricon praised the work, noting that the first volume was "a perfect blend of a classic Yuri at a private girls’ school story with highlights of the modern world intruding at every turn."

References

External links 
Seven Seas Entertainment's A White Rose in Bloom official website

Hakusensha manga
Josei manga
Romance anime and manga
School life in anime and manga
Seven Seas Entertainment titles
Yuri (genre) anime and manga